La Moleta or Moleta d'Alfara  is a mountain of the Serra de l'Espina, a northern prolongation of the Ports de Tortosa-Beseit, Catalonia, Spain. It has an elevation of 812 metres above sea level. La Moleta rises about 5 km NNW above the village of Alfara de Carles. It is readily identifiable from afar, for its striking squarish shape contrasts sharply with the other summits of the mountain chain.

See also
Ports de Tortosa-Beseit
Mountains of Catalonia

References

Ports de Tortosa-Beseit
Mountains of Catalonia